Robert Maher Jr. (born July 10, 1978 in Wisconsin), is a professional Magic: The Gathering player. He picked up the Magic game after sustaining a football injury in high school, and has gone on to become one of the most celebrated players in the game's history, earning the nickname "The Great One".

Magic: The Gathering
Maher played in the junior division of the very first Pro Tour in 1996. His first senior Pro Tour would be in Los Angeles in 1997. The 1999–2000 Pro Tour season would be Maher's most successful season. He would win Pro Tour Chicago and Grand Prix Seattle, make the Top 8 of Grand Prix Nagoya and take second place at the 2000 World Championship. Maher's success throughout the season earned him the Pro Player of the Year title.

In 2002, Maher was suspended from the DCI for 6 months for committing tournament fraud. He participated in false tournaments with Jason Moungey and Chad Butterfield and used the rating points gained to qualify for the World Championships.

Maher won the Masters Series in Yokohama in 2003 and the 2004 Magic Invitational, thus becoming the third player to win a Pro Tour, a Grand Prix, a Masters, and an Invitational. , the card-design he submitted for winning the Invitational, appeared in the Ravnica: City of Guilds set, bearing his likeness. The card has been well received and has seen considerable play in nearly every sanctioned format it has been legal in. In 2010, ChannelFireball.com ranked  as the best Invitational card. In 2006, Maher was inducted into the Magic: The Gathering Hall of Fame as the vote leader in the Class of 2006.

From 2005 to 2014 Maher played only very infrequently on the Pro Tour. He played Pro Tour Journey Into Nyx and Pro Tour Magic 2015, and participated in Pro Tour Fate Reforged as a member of a new team.

Accomplishments

Other accomplishments:
 Pro Player of the Year 1999–2000
 Magic Hall of Fame class of 2006

References

1978 births
Living people
American Magic: The Gathering players
People from Madison, Wisconsin